Eucalyptus articulata, also known as the Ponton Creek mallee, is a low, straggly mallee that is endemic to a small area near Kalgoorlie in the Goldfields-Esperance region of Western Australia. It has smooth bark, lance-shaped leaves, flower buds in groups of seven, white flowers and conical fruit.

Description
Leaves on young plants and coppice regrowth are similar to adult leaves but dull bluish green. The leaves have many large oil glands. The flower buds are arranged in group of seven in leaf axils, sometimes appearing to be in clusters on the ends of the branches. Flowering occurs between July and August and the flowers are white.

Taxonomy and naming
Eucalyptus articulata was first formally described in 1993 by Stephen Hopper and Ian Brooker from a specimen they collected in 1987 east of Mulga Rock in the Great Victoria Desert. The description was published in the journal Nuytsia. The specific epithet (articulata) is a Latin word meaning "jointed" or "distinct", referring to the base of the style.

Distribution and habitat
Ponton Creek mallee grows in red sandy dunes, arkose rubble and sandy loam.

Conservation
In 2008 E. articulata was listed as vulnerable under the Environment Protection and Biodiversity Conservation Act 1999. It has been also been classified as "Threatened Flora (Declared Rare Flora — Extant)" by the Department of Environment and Conservation (Western Australia). The main threat to the species is inappropriate fire regimes but it is not known whether or not the species is fire-tolerant.

See also

List of Eucalyptus species

References

Eucalypts of Western Australia
Trees of Australia
articulata
Myrtales of Australia
Plants described in 1993
Taxa named by Stephen Hopper
Taxa named by Ian Brooker